Natty may refer to:

People with the given name
 Natty Dominique (1896-1982), American jazz trumpeter
 Natty Hollmann (1939-2021), Argentine philanthropist
 Natty King (born 1977), Jamaican Reggae artist
 Natty Zavitz, actor in Degrassi: The Next Generation

People with the nickname
 Natty (British singer) (born 1983), American-British singer-songwriter
 Natty (Thai singer) (born 2002), Thai K-pop singer
 Natarajan Subramaniam, Indian cinematographer

Fictional characters
 Natty Bumppo, protagonist of the Leatherstocking Tales novels
 Natty (Hollyoaks), in the British TV soap opera
 the protagonist of The Journey of Natty Gann, a 1985 Disney film
 Natalie "Natty" Hillard, in the 1993 film Mrs. Doubtfire

Other uses
 Slang for natural, particularly in the bodybuilding community (where it refers to abstention from performance-enhancing drugs)
 Natural Light and related beers, also called Natty

See also

 Natalee
 Natalia (disambiguation)
 Natalie (given name)
 Natasha
 Nathalie
 Nattie Neidhart, a professional wrestler
 Naty
Netty (disambiguation)